Chatelherault railway station serves the villages of Ferniegair and Allanton on the outskirts of Hamilton, South Lanarkshire, Scotland. It is named Chatelherault after the nearby Chatelherault Country Park.

History 
The station was opened as Ferniegair on 1 December 1866 as a terminus for trains approaching from the south on the Caledonian Railway's Coalburn Branch. Passengers for Glasgow had to transfer to Hamilton by coach. It was rebuilt and relocated as a through station on 2 October 1876, with trains continuing to Motherwell railway station on the Clydesdale Junction Railway. The Caledonian Railway closed the station on 1 January 1917, though the line itself continued to carry passengers until October 1965 and freight until 1968.

Re-opening 
The station is on the Argyle Line, and was officially re-opened on 9 December 2005 by First Minister Jack McConnell as part of the extension of the Argyle Line to include Larkhall.

Services 
A trial (for one year) Sunday service commenced from December 2007 with an hourly service in each direction, and due to high uptake was made permanent in December 2008.

The hourly Sunday service runs to/from  via .

References

External links 

 New Link for Larkhall opens – BBC News Scotland website
 RAILSCOT on Larkhall re-opening
 RAILSCOT on Coalburn Branch
 RAILSCOT on Mid Lanark Lines
 Video footage of Chatelherault railway station

Railway stations in South Lanarkshire
Former Caledonian Railway stations
Railway stations in Great Britain opened in 1866
Railway stations in Great Britain closed in 1876
Railway stations in Great Britain opened in 1876
Railway stations in Great Britain closed in 1917
Railway stations in Great Britain opened in 2005
Reopened railway stations in Great Britain
SPT railway stations
Railway stations served by ScotRail
Buildings and structures in Hamilton, South Lanarkshire
1866 establishments in Scotland